Savaran (also Romanized as Savārān and Sawārān) is a village in Varzaq-e Jonubi Rural District, in the Central District of Faridan County, Isfahan Province, Iran. At the 2006 census, its population was 313, in 85 families.

References 

Populated places in Faridan County